William Harrison Randall (July 15, 1812 – August 1, 1881) was a U.S. Representative from Kentucky.

Born near Richmond, Kentucky, Randall completed preparatory studies.
He studied law.
He was admitted to the bar and commenced practice in London, Kentucky, in 1835.
He served as clerk of the circuit court and county court of Laurel County 1836–1844.

Randall was elected as an Unconditional Unionist to the Thirty-eighth and Thirty-ninth Congresses (March 4, 1863 – March 3, 1867).
He served as district judge of the fifteenth Kentucky district 1870–1880.
He died in London, Kentucky, August 1, 1881.
He was interred in the family cemetery at London, Kentucky.

References

External links 
 

1812 births
1881 deaths
People from Madison County, Kentucky
Unconditional Union Party members of the United States House of Representatives from Kentucky
Kentucky Unionists
Kentucky state court judges
Kentucky lawyers
19th-century American politicians
19th-century American judges
19th-century American lawyers
Members of the United States House of Representatives from Kentucky